The Dawson County School District is a public school district in Dawson County, Georgia, United States, based in Dawsonville. It serves the communities of Dawsonville and Juno, and parts of Big Canoe.

Schools
The Dawson County School District has four elementary schools, two middle schools, one high school and one Academy.

Academies
 Hightower Academy

Elementary schools
Black's Mill Elementary School
Kilough Elementary School
Robinson Elementary School
Riverview Elementary School

Middle schools
Dawson County Middle School
Dawson County Junior High School

High school
Dawson County High School

References

External links
 

School districts in Georgia (U.S. state)
Education in Dawson County, Georgia